Mandlenkosi Phillip Galo (born 5 July 1962) is a South African politician who serves as the inaugural president of the African Independent Congress (AIC), a party he and other disgruntled ANC members founded over a demarcation dispute in 2005. He was elected to the National Assembly of South Africa in 2014 and won re-election to a second term in 2019.

References

External links
Mr Mandlenkosi Phillip Galo – Parliament of South Africa
Mr Mandlenkosi Phillip Galo – People's Assembly

Living people
1962 births
Members of the National Assembly of South Africa
21st-century South African politicians
African Independent Congress politicians
People from Matatiele Local Municipality
People from the Eastern Cape